Pedro Bruno may refer to:

 Pedro Paulo Bruno (1888–1949), Brazilian painter
 Pedro Luis Bruno (born 1988), Argentine cricketer